Justin Ikechukwu Obiora Amaluzor (born 17 October 1996) is an English footballer who plays as a forward for Aldershot Town. He was previously known as Justin Nwogu.

Career
Amaluzor played youth football for Luton Town, AFC Kempston Rovers, where he scored 55 goals at U15 and U16 level, and AFC Rushden & Diamonds before joining Dartford on a two-year scholarship in 2013. Amaluzor joined Kent Football United, of the Kent Invicta Football League, on loan in February 2015. Following four goals in his first two games, manager Sam MacNeil said that "Justin has been a revelation so far for us. Coming in as a fresh 18 year old new to senior football he has took his first two games by storm... The boy has tremendous talent and has given us a major threat in behind teams and a natural finish to our moves... During his time with the club he will make a name for himself and I am sure will be playing a very high level of football in years to come."

Amaluzor joined Barnet in April 2015, and played for the under-18s for the remainder of the season before signing a one-year professional contract two months later. He made his League Two debut when he came on as a 53rd-minute substitute for Luke Gambin in a 3–1 win over York City on his 19th birthday on 17 October 2015. Amaluzor, along with teammate Charlie Kennedy, joined Hayes & Yeading United on loan in February 2016. He scored his first goal for Barnet in an EFL Trophy game against Peterborough United on 8 November 2016. He then went on loan to Hemel Hempstead Town in January 2017. He joined Hemel on loan for a second time on 7 September 2017, and then left the club for a fourth loan spell, this time with Hampton & Richmond Borough, in December 2017. He then joined Bognor Regis Town on loan in March 2018. He was released by Barnet at the end of the 2017–18 season.

Amaluzor joined Braintree Town on 31 August 2018. He then signed for Maidstone United on 15 February 2019 on a contract until the end of the following season. Maidstone's Head of Football John Still said "Justin is quick, bright and has got a goal in him. He can play wide on either side – he likes to play on the right and cut in on his left foot, and he can play off the main striker." Amaluzor confirmed in April 2021 that he was leaving Maidstone.

On 21 June 2021, Motherwell announced the signing of Amaluzor on a one-year contract. He made his debut and scored his first goal for the club in a 2–0 win in a Scottish League Cup group stage match against Annan Athletic on 24 July 2021.

On 17 June 2022, Amaluzor was announced to have returned to England to join National League club Aldershot Town.

Career statistics

References

External links

1996 births
Living people
English people of Nigerian descent
English footballers
Nigerian footballers
Association football forwards
Luton Town F.C. players
Kempston Rovers F.C. players
AFC Rushden & Diamonds players
Dartford F.C. players
Kent Football United F.C. players
Barnet F.C. players
Hayes & Yeading United F.C. players
Hemel Hempstead Town F.C. players
Hampton & Richmond Borough F.C. players
Bognor Regis Town F.C. players
Braintree Town F.C. players
Maidstone United F.C. players
Motherwell F.C. players
Aldershot Town F.C. players
English Football League players
National League (English football) players
Scottish Professional Football League players